The 1912 Yale Bulldogs football team represented Yale University in the 1912 college football season. The Bulldogs finished with a 7–1–1 record under first-year head coach Art Howe.  The team's only loss was to Harvard by a 20–0 score in the final game of the season.  Yale end Douglas Bomeisler and center Hank Ketcham were consensus picks for the 1912 College Football All-America Team, and two other Yale players (guards Caroll Cooney and Talbot Pendleton) received first-team All-America honors from at least one selector. Guard Ted York died following the Army game.

Schedule

References

Yale
Yale Bulldogs football seasons
Yale Bulldogs football